Britney Cooper (born 23 August 1989) is a Trinidadian cricketer who plays for Trinidad and Tobago, Barbados Royals and the West Indies as a right-handed batter. She top-scored during the semi-final of the 2016 ICC Women's World Twenty20 against New Zealand with a score of 61, helping her team to qualify for the final.

In October 2018, she was named in the West Indies' squad for the 2018 ICC Women's World Twenty20 tournament in the West Indies. In January 2020, she was named in West Indies' squad for the 2020 ICC Women's T20 World Cup in Australia. In May 2021, Cooper was awarded with a central contract from Cricket West Indies.

References

External links

1989 births
Living people
Trinidad and Tobago women cricketers
West Indies women One Day International cricketers
West Indies women Twenty20 International cricketers
West Indian women cricketers
Barbados Royals (WCPL) cricketers